Wetzel Orson "Judge" Whitaker (September 30, 1908 – November 1, 1985) was a filmmaker and animator.  He is most known for his early work as a Disney animator, particularly the animation of the stepsisters from Cinderella (1950 film), and his work as a director for BYU Motion Picture Studios.  Most of the films he was involved in, such as The Windows of Heaven, Johnny Lingo and Pioneers in Petticoats, were made in cooperation with his brother Scott Whitaker.  The two of them ran the BYU Motion Picture Studio during this time, receiving commission from the Church of Jesus Christ of Latter-day Saints to make films.

Biography 
Wetzel "Judge" Whitaker was born in Heber City, Utah and grew up primarily in Utah and Colorado. His nickname came from his brother calling him "Judge", comparing him to the local justice of the peace. He attended the Art Institute of Chicago and in 1929 became the Art Director for the St. Louis Times.  In 1930, Judge married Doris Youkstetter and a few years later had his first child during the Great Depression.  In 1932, Judge moved his family to California where he worked for the Charles Mintz Studios and then Disney Studios.  In 1953, Judge Whitaker left his job at Disney and went on to direct the BYU Motion Picture Studio. In 1971, he was given an honorary doctorate by BYU, a few months after receiving his honorary doctorate from BYU, Judge Whitaker's wife, Doris, died and in 1973 Judge remarried his childhood friend, Louise Eccles.  He retired from his work at the motion picture studio in 1974.

Disney Studios 
In 1932 during the Great Depression, Judge was laid off from his job at the paper.  With no job, and a young wife and newborn baby to provide for, he began to work freelance jobs to make ends meet.  While working as a freelance artist Judge met Walt Pfeiffer, a childhood friend of Walt Disney.  Judge had never heard of Walt Disney before but, after learning about this 'up-and-coming' young man, decided to move to California and apply to work for Disney Studios.  Judge was initially hired as a "trainee" animator, but after winning a competition among the new animators to animate a new Disney character, Donald Duck, he became a full-fledged animator. While working for Disney, Judge was part of projects such as Cinderella, Peter Pan and Alice in Wonderland.

BYU Motion Picture Studio 
In 1945, Judge Whitaker was asked by Brethren of his Church, the Church of Jesus Christ of Latter-Day Saints, to create a film on the Church Welfare Program.  Judge recruited fellow Church members from Disney to help him with the project.  These men consisted of Eric Larson, W. Cleon Skousen, John Lewis and Scott Whitaker.  This small council of men began work on two films for their Church, Church Welfare in Action and The Lord's Way, which debut in Salt Lake City, UT in 1948.

In 1952, Judge requested a year long leave of absence from Disney to spend time with his family in Utah.  During this leave of absence, President Ernest L. Wilkinson created the Department of Motion Picture Production at BYU and offered Judge the opportunity to head the new department.  Judge accepted his offer and in January 1953 began organizing the new department on campus.  In 1971, Judge Whitaker was given an honorary doctorate by BYU.

Filmography

Animator

Officer Duck (1939)
Donald's Dog Laundry (1940)
Mr. Duck Steps Out (1940)
Put-Put Troubles (1940)
Donald's Vacation (1940)
The Reluctant Dragon (1941)
Chef Donald (1941)
Donald's Snow Fight (1942)
Donald Gets Drafted (1942)
The Vanishing Private (1942)
Sky Trooper (1942)
Fall Out Fall In (1943)
Donald Duck and the Gorilla (1944)
Donald's Off Day (1944)
The Cold-Blooded Penguin (1945)
The Clock Watcher (1945)
No Sail (1945)
A Knight for a Day (1946)
Make Mine Music (1946)
Lighthouse Keeping (1946)
Straight Shooters (1947)
Bootle Beetle (1947)
Fun and Fancy Free (1947)
Melody Time (1948)
Tea for Two Hundred (1948)
Honey Harvester (1949)
All in a Nutshell (1949)
The Greener Yard (1949)
Slide, Donald, Slide (1949)
Lion Around (1950)
Cinderella (1950)
Food for Feudin' (1950)
Bee at the Beach (1950)
Chicken in the Rough (1951)
Corn Chips (1951)
Alice in Wonderland (1951)
Lambert the Sheepish Lion (1952)
Peter Pan (1953)
Mickey Mouse Disco (1980)

Producer/director

The Church Welfare in Action (1948)
The Lord's Way (1948)
 A Teacher is Born (1955)
How Near to the Angels (1956)
The Decision (1957)
Feed My Sheep (1957)
Up in Smoke (1960)
'Til Death Do Us Part (1960)
Shannon (1961)
Worth Waiting For (1962)
The Search for Truth (1962)
Measure of a Man (1962)
The Windows of Heaven (1963)
Of Heaven and Home (1963)
Bitter Wind (1963)
Man's Search for Happiness (1964)
No More a Stranger (1964)
How Do I Love Thee? (1965)
Love is for the Byrds (1965)
Losers Weepers (1965)
The Long Road Back (1965)
And Should We Die (1966)
Marriage: What Kind For You? (1967)
Are You the One?: Choosing a Mate (1967)
The Three Witnesses (1968)
Worthy to Stand (1969)
Pioneers in Petticoats (1969)
Never a Bride (1969)
Johnny Lingo (1969)
Are You Listening? (1971)
The Lost Manuscript (1974)
Ancient America Speaks (1974)
Cipher in the Snow (1974)
Follow Me (1983)

References

External links
 
 
 Biography on ldsfilm.com
Whitaker, Wetzel O. at Harold B. Lee Library

1908 births
1985 deaths
Latter Day Saints from Utah
School of the Art Institute of Chicago alumni
Brigham Young University people
People from Heber City, Utah
Latter Day Saints from Colorado
Latter Day Saints from California